Mesothisa is a genus of moths in the family Geometridae described by Warren in 1905.

Species
Some species of this genus are:
Mesothisa cinnamonea Carcasson, 1964
Mesothisa crassilinea Carcasson, 1962
Mesothisa dubiefi Viette, 1977
Mesothisa flaccida Warren, 1905
Mesothisa gracililinea Warren, 1905
Mesothisa misanga Herbulot, 1997
Mesothisa ozola Prout, 1926
Mesothisa pulverata Carcasson, 1964
Mesothisa royi Herbulot, 1954
Mesothisa substigmata Carcasson, 1964
Mesothisa tanala Herbulot, 1968

References

Geometridae